This is a list of films which placed number-one at the South Korean box office during 2009, based on admissions.

Highest-grossing films

References

See also 
 List of South Korean films of 2009

2009 in South Korean cinema
2009
South Korea